Akim Djaha (born 14 September 1998) is a professional footballer who plays as a defender for Championnat National 2 club FC Martigues. Born in France, he plays for Comoros national team.

Club career
Djaha is a former youth academy player of Angers and Trélissac. He joined Vannes in May 2020.

On 8 June 2021, Djaha joined Martigues.

International career
Born in France, Djaha represents Comoros in international football. He received maiden call-up to Comoros national team on 21 June 2021 for FIFA Arab Cup qualification match against Palestine. He made his international debut three days later in the same match, which ended in a 5–1 defeat for Comoros.

Career statistics

International

References

External links
 
Player profile at comorosfootball.com (in French)

1998 births
Living people
Footballers from Bordeaux
French sportspeople of Comorian descent
Citizens of Comoros through descent
Association football defenders
French footballers
Comorian footballers
Comoros international footballers
Championnat National 2 players
Championnat National 3 players
Trélissac FC players
Vannes OC players